The Communards’ Wall at the Père Lachaise cemetery is where, on May 28, 1871, during "Bloody Week", the final fighting of the  Paris Commune, one-hundred and forty-seven fédérés or Commune soldiers, captured by the French army, were executed and buried in a common grave  at the foot of the wall, along with another nineteen officers.

The Père Lachaise cemetery was established in May 1804 on a land owned by the Jesuits for centuries, and where Père ("Father") Lachaise, confessor of Louis XIV, lived the latter part of his life. The cemetery of the aristocracy in the 19th century, it also received the remains of famous people from previous eras. During the spring of 1871 the last of the combatants of the Commune entrenched themselves in the cemetery. The French Army, which was summoned to suppress the Commune, won control towards the end of the afternoon of May 28, captured the remaining Commune soldiers.  As with other prisoners taken during the Commune, those captured with weapons in hand, numbering 147, were lined up and executed. Those executed at the wall also included a group of Commune officers, who had been captured earlier at other locations, imprisoned in two army barracks nearby, tried by military tribunals, sentenced to death, and delivered to the cemetery for execution and burial. This brought the total number to an estimated but unconfirmed 166. They were all buried in the same common grave.  

The number executed and buried at the wall there is not known exactly, but is estimated at 166 by historian Michele Audin.   Other casualties were brought to the cemetery later from other parts of the city and buried in the cemetery.    The wall is now the site of an annual commemoration of the Commune and its casualties.

See also
 Communards
 Semaine sanglante

Bibliography 
 Audin, Michele, La Semaine Sanglante, Mai 1871, Legendes et Conmptes, Libertalia Publishers (2021) (in French)

References

Walls
History of Paris
Paris Commune
Cemeteries in Paris
Buildings and structures in the 20th arrondissement of Paris